WWF WrestleMania Challenge is a professional wrestling video game based on the World Wrestling Federation (WWF), released in 1990 for the Nintendo Entertainment System by LJN and in 1992 for the Family Computer by Hot-B.

The game features nine wrestlers: Hulk Hogan, André the Giant, "Macho King" Randy Savage, The Ultimate Warrior, Big Boss Man, Brutus "The Barber" Beefcake, Ravishing Rick Rude, Hacksaw Jim Duggan, and "Yourself" (a generic character). In a two-player game, both players can choose a differently-shaded version of Yourself, each having a unique theme song.

The game was originally developed under the title WWF Survivor Series. After this release, development of games under the WrestleMania name shifted to Sculptured Software, which developed WWF Super WrestleMania and WWF WrestleMania: Steel Cage Challenge.

Gameplay
Features include fluid gameplay and unique (albeit small) movesets for each wrestler. Matches are presented at a high-angle, isometric view of the ring which includes the wrestlers' stamina bars along the apron. An empty bar will render the player vulnerable to pinfalls.

Modes of play include a one-on-one match, a tag team match, a three-on-three Survivor Series elimination match (in the latter two the player can cause their NPC partner to attack the NPC opponent inside or outside the ring) and a championship mode where the player takes control of "Yourself" and must defeat all of the game's wrestlers to win the championship. Also included is a two player-only tag team championship mode where the players control two "yourself" characters and must defeat the game's wrestlers in a series of tag team matches to become champions.

Reception

See also
List of licensed wrestling video games
List of fighting games

References

External links

1990 video games
Hot B games
LJN games
Nintendo Entertainment System games
Nintendo Entertainment System-only games
Rare (company) games
Video games with isometric graphics
WrestleMania video games
WWE video games
Video games scored by David Wise
Professional wrestling games
Video games developed in the United Kingdom